The Cradle is the second full-length album from Oxford, Mississippi, indie-rock band, Colour Revolt.  It is the band's first since drummer Len Clark, bassist Patrick Addison, and guitarist Jimmy Cajoleas left in 2008 and were replaced by drummer Daniel Davison, keyboardist Brooks Tipton, and bassist/producer Hank Sullivant.  It is also their first for their new label Dualtone Records, who signed the band after they were dropped by Fat Possum in 2008.  It was released on August 10, 2010 and has received the highest reviews out of the band's three releases thus far.  The lyrics for much of the album deal with the hardships endured by the band after the lineup change and being dropped from their label, specifically in the first two songs, "8 Years," and "Our Names."

Track listing

 "8 Years" - 3:36
 "Our Names" - 5:27
 "Heartbeat" - 3:06
 "The Cradle" - 3:05
 "Everything is the Same" - 4:35
 "She Don't Talk" - 4:42
 "Each Works" - 3:58
 "Mona Lisa" - 4:04
 "Brought to Life" - 5:06
 "Reno" - 6:02

Personnel
Band
 Jesse Coppenbarger - vocals, guitar, keys
 Sean Kirkpatrick - vocals, guitar
 Daniel Davison - drums, percussion
 Brooks Tipton - keys
 Hank Sullivant - bass guitar
 Louise Hviid - spoken word on "She Don't Talk"

Technical
Alex Hornbake - engineering
Hank Sullivant - producer
Clay Jones - mixing
John Golden - mastering

Artwork
Matt Govaere - art direction, design
Robert Lenz - art direction, design
Joshua Burwell - interior illustrations

References

2010 albums